Walnut–Locust/Avenue of the Arts (also Walnut–Locust) is a subway station on SEPTA's Broad Street Line in Philadelphia, Pennsylvania.  The station is located between Walnut Street and Locust Street at 200 South Broad Street in the Avenue of the Arts district of Center City, Philadelphia.

Walnut–Locust is served by local trains, special express trains for sporting events, and is the southern terminus for express trains, which reverse direction on tracks immediately south of the station.  On the special service, the station is the last stop before its terminus at the NRG station.

It is the southernmost station in the Center City Concourse, the 500,000+ sq ft underground pedestrian concourse in Center City, which extends to Spruce Street. The concourse connects to City Hall Station, the Market–Frankford Line, Subway–Surface Trolley Lines, Regional Rail and PATCO Speedline's 12–13th & Locust Station and 15–16th & Locust Station.  However, no free interchange is available.

Passengers utilizing Walnut–Locust station may access the Kimmel Center for the Performing Arts, the Bellevue shops and restaurants, and the Academy of Music.  Seven blocks east of the station lies Washington Square, while Rittenhouse Square lies four blocks west.

History 
Walnut-Locust station was built by the city of Philadelphia and opened on April 20, 1930.  This extended express trains one stop south from their initial terminus at City Hall station.

Station layout

Gallery

References

External links 

 Walnut Street entrance from Google Maps Street View
 Locust Street entrance from Google Maps Street View
 Spruce Street entrance from Google Maps Street View

SEPTA Broad Street Line stations
Railway stations in Philadelphia
Railway stations in the United States opened in 1930
Railway stations located underground in Pennsylvania